The Romania women's national basketball team is the national women's basketball team representing Romania. It is administrated by the Romanian Basketball Federation.

Current roster
Roster for the EuroBasket Women 2015.

 4  Claudia Pop
 5  Andreea Olah
 6  Sonia Ursu-Kim
 7   Annemarie Părău
 8  Gabriela Cursaru
 9  Elisabeth Pavel
 11  Gabriela Irimia
 13  Florina Pașcalău
 14  Alina Crăciun
 21  Adina Stoiedin
 24  Ancuţa Stoenescu
 44  Gabriela Mărginean

Head Coach position
  Florin Nini 2014-15
  Miroslav Popovic 2016
  Dragan Petričević 2017-2019
  Ayhan Avci 2019-present

See also
 Sport in Romania
 Romania women's national under-19 basketball team
 Romania women's national under-17 basketball team
 Romania women's national 3x3 team

References

External links
 Romanian Basketball Federation
 Romania Basketball Records at FIBA Archive
 Romanian National Basketball Team - Women at Eurobasket.com

National, women's
Basketball teams in Romania
Basketball, women's
Women's national basketball teams